Quincy Dodd (born 13 April 2000) is an Australian rugby league footballer who plays for the Sydney Roosters in the NRL Women's Premiership and the Cronulla-Sutherland Sharks in the NSWRL Women's Premiership.

Background
Dodd was born in Kogarah, New South Wales and is a Cronulla-Caringbah junior.

Playing career
In 2017 and 2018, Dodd played for the Cronulla-Sutherland Sharks Tarsha Gale Cup side, who were coached by her father, Colin. 

In May 2018, Dodd represented NSW City at the Women's National Championships. In June 2018, she was 18th player for New South Wales. 

In September 2018, she joined the Sydney Roosters NRL Women's Premiership squad but did not play a game. On 6 October 2018, she represented the Prime Minister's XIII in their win over Papua New Guinea.

2019
In June, she represented NSW City at the Women's National Championships.

In Round 3 of the 2019 NRL Women's season, Dodd made her NRLW debut for the Roosters in their 16–24 loss to the St George Illawarra Dragons.

2020
On 22 February, Dodd came off the bench in the Indigenous All Stars 10–4 win over the Maori All Stars. In March, Dodd joined the Canterbury-Bankstown Bulldogs NSWRL Women's Premiership team.

On 25 October, Dodd came off the bench and scored a try in the Roosters' 10–20 NRLW Grand Final loss to the Brisbane Broncos. On 13 November, Dodd made her State of Origin debut for New South Wales in their 18–24 loss to Queensland.

2021
On 20 February, Dodd represented the Indigenous All Stars for the third time, in their 24–0 loss to the Māori All Stars. In March, she rejoined the Sharks for the 2021 NSWRL Women's Premiership season.

References

External links
Sydney Roosters profile

2000 births
Living people
Indigenous Australian rugby league players
Australian female rugby league players
Rugby league hookers
Sydney Roosters (NRLW) players